Charles Stephenson may refer to:

 Charles Bruce Stephenson (1929–2001), American astronomer 
 Charles C. Stephenson, Jr., American petroleum industry executive and philanthropist
 Charles Elwood Stephenson (1898–1965), Canadian politician
 Charles Stephenson (rower), New Zealand rowing champion
 Charles Skip Stephenson (1940–1992), American actor and comedian
 Charles W. Stephenson (1853–1924), English amateur international footballer

See also
Charles Stevenson (disambiguation)